I've Got Your Number is an album by saxophonist Thomas Chapin which was recorded in 1993 and released on the Arabesque label.

Reception

The AllMusic review by Scott Yanow said "Although this is essentially a modern bop session, it is obvious that altoist Thomas Chapin was open to more explorative music. ...   The overall results are quite pleasing and often exciting within the modern mainstream of jazz".

Track listing
All compositions by Thomas Chapin except where noted
 "I've Got Your Number" (Cy Coleman, Carolyn Leigh) – 5:44
 "Drinkin'" – 7:38
 "Time Waits" (Bud Powell) – 7:30
 "Moon Ray" (Artie Shaw, Arthur Quenzer, Paul Madison) – 7:43
 "Don't Look Now" – 6:03
 "The Present" – 6:55
 "The Walking Wounded" – 8:42
 "Rhino!" – 5:54

Personnel
Thomas Chapin – alto saxophone, flute
Ronnie Mathews – piano
Ray Drummond – double bass
Steve Johns – drums
Louis Bauzo – congas (tracks 5 & 7)

References

Arabesque Records albums
Thomas Chapin albums
1993 albums